Carebara bruni is a species of ant in the subfamily Formicinae. It is found in Sri Lanka and China.

References

External links

 at antwiki.org

Myrmicinae
Hymenoptera of Asia
Insects described in 1913